Braväcovo (until World War II) is a village and municipality in Brezno District, in the Banská Bystrica Region of central Slovakia.

History
The village arose in the 16th century as a settlement within Beňuš. It was founded by  German miners and Polish coalmakers. In 1808 it was mentioned as a shepherds colony in the Horehronie Region.

Genealogical resources

The records for genealogical research are available at the state archive "Statny Archiv in Banska Bystrica, Slovakia"

 Roman Catholic church records (births/marriages/deaths): 1786-1896 (parish B)

See also
 List of municipalities and towns in Slovakia

References

External links
https://web.archive.org/web/20070513023228/http://www.statistics.sk/mosmis/eng/run.html
http://www.bravacovo.host.sk
Surnames of living people in Bravacovo

Villages and municipalities in Brezno District